Arthur Wakerley (May 15, 1862 – 4 April 1931) was a British architect, businessman and politician.

Life
Born in Melton Mowbray, he was articled to James Bird. He was a Fellow of the Royal Institute of British Architects and sometime President of the Leicester Society of Architects. He was President of the Leicester Liberal Association and in 1886 was elected as a councillor for Middle St Margaret's Ward and was Mayor of Leicester in 1897, the youngest mayor since the reforms of 1835. He used the role of mayor to support a wide range of charitable and religious works and attempted to position the role of mayor as a non-party political one. His year of office was marred by two local disasters – the railway accident at Wellingborough and the Whitwick Colliery explosion that claimed 35 lives. He twice (unsuccessfully) contested the Melton Division for a seat in Parliament. He stood as a Liberal candidate in 1895 and 1900.

Outside work and politics Arthur Wakerley was an enthusiastic Wesleyan lay preacher and ardent temperance worker as well as being interested in archaeology and poetry.

He planned the development of the North Evington area. Other examples of his architectural work in Leicester include the Turkey Cafe, Granby Street (1901), the Synagogue on Highfield Street, the Coronation Buildings, High Street (1901–03; formerly known as the Singer Building) and the Wycliffe Society Cottage Homes for the Blind.

Grade II Listed buildings by Arthur Wakerley
Below is a list of the fourteen buildings in Leicester by Arthur Wakerley that have been listed. All are Grade II, and most relate to the period 1880s to 1900s. Many more of his building survive without being listed, including factories, terraced housing, semi-detached and detached houses, and 'Crown Hill', a substantial brick mansion he built for himself on Gwendolen Road. The listed post-war houses are four example pairs of the design of council house Wakerley produced in the 1920s, selected because they remain closest to the original design and have their original sash windows. As well as Leicester, the design was widely adopted in Glasgow, Belfast and Welwyn Garden City.

|}

Notes to the table

References

External links
 The Wakerley Trail
 Page on Leicester City Council website

1862 births
Architects from Leicester
Mayors of places in Leicestershire
People from Melton Mowbray
Liberal Party (UK) parliamentary candidates
Burials at Welford Road Cemetery
1931 deaths